The Case of Doctor Galloy (French: Le cas du docteur Galloy) is a 1951 French drama film directed by Maurice Boutel and starring Jean-Pierre Kérien, Henri Rollan and Suzy Prim.

Cast
 Jean-Pierre Kérien as Le docteur Galloy  
 Henri Rollan as Le professeur  
 Suzy Prim as L'amie de Mme Guérin  
 Lucienne Le Marchand as Mme Guérin  
 Louis Seigner as Le docteur Clarenz  
 Lucas Gridoux as Le guérisseur  
 Andrews Engelmann 
 André Le Gall 
 Juliette Faber 
 Jacqueline Pierreux

References

Bibliography 
 Philippe Rège. Encyclopedia of French Film Directors, Volume 1. Scarecrow Press, 2009.

External links 
 

1951 films
1951 drama films
French drama films
1950s French-language films
Films directed by Maurice Boutel
French black-and-white films
1950s French films